Mikhail Vyacheslavovich Levin (born 19 April 1969) is a former Russian football player.

External links
 

1969 births
Living people
PFC CSKA Moscow players
Soviet footballers
FC Krystal Kherson players
FC Zimbru Chișinău players
Navbahor Namangan players
FC Zenit Saint Petersburg players
Russian footballers
Russian Premier League players
FC Amkar Perm players
Russian expatriate footballers
Expatriate footballers in China
Foshan Fosti F.C. players
Association football forwards
Association football midfielders
FC Znamya Truda Orekhovo-Zuyevo players
FC Zenit-2 Saint Petersburg players